The fifth season of the Philippine television reality competition show, The Clash is broadcast by GMA Network. Both Rayver Cruz and Julie Anne San Jose remained as the hosts, but Ken Chan and Rita Daniela did not return, making it the first season not to include Journey hosts. However, season 1's Garrett Bolden and season 2's runner-up, Thea Astley, serves as the livestreaming host; while season 1 alumni, Muriel Lomadilla and Lyra Micolob serves as the Clash 360 online exclusive hosts of the show.

It premiered on January 22, 2023, on the network's Sunday Grande line up.

Online auditions
The show opens online auditions on August 7, 2022, for singers aged 16 and above, after the third and fourth seasons.

Top 30
The first five clashers in the Top 30 are announced on December 18, 2022, until the last five contestants on January 3, 2023.

The 30 clashers were electronically paired to battle it out in a singing duel with the winner advancing to the next round.

Color key

  Winner
  Runner-up
  Finalists
  Eliminated in the Fourth Round
  Eliminated in the Third Round
  Eliminated in the Second Round
  Eliminated in the First Round

Round 1: One on One
The randomizer electronically select the clashers that will face each other in the clash arena. After their performance, the clash panel selects who will advance to the next round. They need to get at least majority of the panels votes.

Color key

Episode 1 (January 22)
Episode hashtag: #TheClashUnangSalpukan

The episode opens with season 4 winner Mariane Osabel performing Sia's "Unstoppable" with the Top 30 clashers of season five; before joining the Clash Masters and the Clash panelists where they sang "There's Nothing Holdin' Me Back" by Shawn Mendes along with past Clash winners, Golden Cañedo (season 1), Jeremiah Tiangco (season 2), and Jessica Villarubin (season 3).

Episode 2 (January 29)
Episode hashtag: #TheClashLabananNgPangarap

Episode 3 (February 5)
Episode hashtag: #TheClashWalangUrungan

Episode 4 (February 12)
Episode hashtag: #TheClashAgawanNgUpuan

Episode 5 (February 19) 
Episode hashtag: #TheClashHindiSusuko

Round 2: Laban Kung Laban 
The format of the second round in the fifth season is a five-way battle where the randomizer selects the clasher who will pick the other four singers to compose the group and perform for the judges' vote to advance in the Top 12.

Color key

Episode 6 (February 26) 
At the end of the first round, the randomizer selects Mark Avila to commence the second round. The last clasher chosen by Avila selected the first contestant of the group to perform first.

Episode hashtag: #TheClashUnangGulat

Episode 7 (March 5) 
After the first battle, the randomizer selects two clashers (Jayvee Real and Lara Bernardo) to take turns picking their sets of four clashers before switching their places to the opposite groups. Real volunteered his group to perform first while the last clasher originally selected by Bernardo started the next battle.

Episode hashtag: #TheClashRambol

Episode 8 (March 12) 
Episode hashtag: #TheClashSurprise

Round 3: Pares Kontra Pares
In this round, the clashers were paired. Isaac Zamudio, who was the last to be safe from Round 2, was selected by the host to choose his partner from the remaining clashers for a duet while the selected partner each take turns to compose the pairs. 

The last two remaining clashers, who did not choose to be paired by other clashers, have the chance to steal another clasher to be their duo. Italicized names are those clashers who have a chance to steal.

Mark Avila chose to steal Jemy Picardal, while Jean Drilon chose to steal Arabelle dela Cruz. The initial duos of Picardal and dela Cruz, who are Isaac Zamudio and Liana Castillo, are eventually paired off.

Below is the groupings selection.

1The clasher was selected by the host.

For each set, a pair will be chosen electronically, who will in turn choose their opponent pair. After the performance, the clash panel will vote for a pair who will advance to the next round. For the losing pair, they will compete with each other in Matira ang Matibay round and only one will remain, still subject to the votes of the clash panel.

Color key

Episode 9 (March 19) 
Episode hashtag: #TheClashParesKontraPares

Non-competition performance: "Gusto Ko Nang Bumitaw" by Jessica Villarubin and Hannah Precillas

Elimination chart
Color key

Notable contestants
Top 30
Keith de Guzman was the daily winner in the third season of Tawag ng Tanghalan and recently competed in its sixth season. She also competed in the second seasons of Born to Be a Star and Idol Philippines.
Jef Fresco first appeared in Protégé: The Battle for the Big Break as an auditionee. He was the regional contender in the sixth season of Tawag ng Tanghalan and recently appeared in TiktoClock.
The following Top 30 clashers have recently competed on Tawag ng Tanghalan:
Luna Gray, whose birth name is Kimberly Rosal, was the regional contender for Metro Manila in the fourth quarter of the third season.
Jade Toston was the regional contender for Mindanao in the second quarter of the third season.
Murline Uddin was the regional contender in the sixth season.
Don Amuel was the regional contender in the sixth season.
Nash Casas was the regional contender in the first season.
Beverlyn Silva was the regional contender representing Luzon in the second season of Tawag ng Tanghalan. She also competed in the second season of Idol Philippines where she was eliminated in the Do or Die Round.
Carl Lasam appeared in the third season of Pilipinas Got Talent where Clash panelist Ai-Ai delas Alas was one of the judges.
Clar Wepingco previously competed in Tawag ng Tanghalan Kids and returned in fourth season of Tawag ng Tanghalan as the defending champion before the COVID-19 pandemic before recently competing in the sixth season. She also competed in Eat Bulaga!s Lola's Playlist: Beat the Champion.

Top 15
Pupa Dadivas was the regional contender in the first season of Tawag ng Tanghalan. She recently competed for Miss Universe Philippines 2022 and finished in the Top 32.
Jayvee Real previously competed in Sing Galing.

Top 12
Kirby Bas previously competed in Sing Galing.Competing'''

Mark Avila was a member of apl.de.ap's team on the second season of The Voice of the Philippines where he was eliminated in the Battle rounds. He was also the defending champion in the fourth season of Tawag ng Tanghalan.
The following clashers have recently competed on Tawag ng Tanghalan:
Rex Baculfo was one of the defending champions in the fifth season.
Arabelle dela Cruz was one of the Top 6 grand finalists in the second season.
Jerome Granada was the daily winner in the fourth season. 
Mariel Reyes was one of the Quarter II semifinalists in the fifth season.
Liana Castillo was one of the grand winners of Toppstar 2017. She recently competed in Eat Bulaga!s competition segments, Lola's Playlist: Beat the Champion and Hype Kang Bata Ka! 2018.
Jean Drilon recently competed in Eat Bulaga!'''s Bida Next and appeared on the show's quiz segment Kontrapelo: Sa Pula, Sa Puti and Wil Time Bigtime.
Jamie Elise competed in the second season of Born to Be a Star and appeared as a contestant in Wowowin.
Jemy Picardal previously competed in the second season of Wish 107.5's online competition Wishcovery.
Isaac Zamudio was part of Sarah Geronimo's team on the first season of The Voice Kids and was eliminated in the Battle round to Lyca Gairanod who eventually won the season. He was a participant of Eat Bulaga!s Barangay Singing Idol. He also competed in the third season of Tawag ng Tanghalan as the daily winner and the fourth season as one of the quarter-finalists. He recently competed in the second season of Idol Philippines as one of the Top 20 contestants in the Solo Round.

References

External links
 

2023 Philippine television seasons